Venous arch may refer to:

Plantar venous arch
Jugular venous arch
Dorsal venous arch of the foot
Deep palmar venous arch
Superficial palmar venous arch